Krk (archaic German: Vegl,) is a Croatian island in the northern Adriatic Sea, located near Rijeka in the Bay of Kvarner and part of Primorje-Gorski Kotar county. Krk is tied with Cres as the largest Adriatic island, depending on the methodology used to measure the coastline. Krk is the most populous island in the Adriatic, with multiple towns and villages that contain a total of 19,383 (2011) inhabitants.

History

Prehistory 

Archeological findings indicate that the island was inhabited continuously since Neolithic, although very few information the earliest people is known. In later periods, Greek and Latin sources refer to Κύριστα (Ancient Greek) or Curicta (Latin) as one of the Apsyrtidian or Electridian islands held by the people known as Liburnians. The Liburnians called the island "Curicum", which name is assumed to be given the island by its original inhabitants.

There are the remains of prehistoric settlements near Draga Bašćanska, as well as Bronze and Iron Age earthworks near Malinska, Dobrinj, Vrbnik and Baška.

Roman era 
Krk came under Roman rule once they defeated the Liburnians. The Town of Krk (Curicum) became a town with Italic law whose status evolved to give it the rights of a municipality. Nothing is known about the internal organizations of the town of Krk during this time. Near the present day Franciscan monastery, the remains of thermal baths have been found. The defensive walls of Roman Curicum were among the most secure of all the towns on the Eastern Adriatic fortified by the Romans. Work began on their construction during the Civil War in Rome (50 BCE) and they were further strengthened in the 60s of the 2nd century CE, to enable them to withstand attacks by the Quadi and the Marcamanni who were at that time threatening the Adriatic. Not far from Krk in 49 BCE there was a decisive sea battle between Caesar and Pompey, which was described impressively by the Roman writer Lucan (39–65 CE) in his work Pharsalia. When the Empire was divided, Krk came under the Eastern Roman Empire.

Migration Period 
The walls of the town of Krk could not withstand attacks by the Avars (7th century), but in contrast to Salona, Scardona and Aeona, life in Krk quickly returned to normal, and Krk functioned as one of the Dalmatian city-states. The Croats penetrated into the town on several occasions. They retained many of the Roman names they found there and so it is said that Krk has a "mosaic dialect". Following the Treaty of Aachen (812) the entire island was ceded to the Byzantine Empire and was governed according to the norms of that Empire. During the reign of Emperor Constantine Porphyrogenitus (10th century), Krk was known as Vekla, of which the Romanized variant, also used by the Venetians, was Veglia.

Reign of Croatian Counts and Kings 
There are no extant documents showing when Krk became part of the Croatian state. It is known that from around 875 the Byzantine town paid the Croatian rulers 110 gold pieces a year to be able peacefully to keep their hold there. While the Croatian state was being established, Krk found itself on the Venetians' route to the Mediterranean. The Venetians conquered the town for the first time in 1001, and from then Krk's history was closely linked with the history of the Republic of Venice for seven centuries. During the reign of Peter Krešimir IV the Croatian rulers regained their power, but the Venetians took Krk for the second time in 1118.

Reign of the Krk Counts (from 1430 on – the Frankopan family) 

When the Venetians conquered Krk for the second time in 1118, the local noble family, the unknown Dujams, received Krk as part of a pact with Venice, and they became Counts. When Dujam died in 1163, Venice allowed his sons to make their position hereditary, after a payment of 350 Byzantine gold pieces as tax. In a short time the Krk Counts became so powerful, that at one time from 1244 to 1260, Venice rescinded their authority. This failed to impede their rise, however. They increased economic exploitation, but they also endeavoured to strengthen old traditions and rights with various statutes (the Vinodol Code 1288 and the Vrbnik Statute, 1388). Dujam's youngest son, who died in 1209, succeeded in extending his authority to the mainland, began to serve the Croatian-Hungarian King and received the district of Modruš. Due to his economic strength and social standing, his opponents fought each other for his favour. The Counts became so strong that no power could threaten them (until the Turks). Members of his family were leaders in Split, Trogir and Senj, and from 1392 one of them (Ivan V), became a Croatian-Dalmatian Ban. In 1430 they took the surname Frankopan (Frangipane), claiming to have Roman origins. That year they adopted a coat of arms showing two lions breaking a piece of bread (Latin: frangere panem, break bread). From 1449, the descendants of Nikola IV founded eight branches of his family, and together with the Zrinski Counts were the ruling feudal family in the whole of Croatia right up to 1671. The Frankopans produced seven Croatian Bans, and many of them were patrons of Croatian artists.

Ivan VII Frankopan in particular was the only prince of the semi-independent Principality of Krk. He also promoted the settlement of Morlachs and Vlachs (originally Romanians who later split into Istro-Romanians) in the island (specifically in the areas of Dubašnica and Poljica and between the castles of Dobrinj and Omišalj) to have a bigger manpower. Thus, these Istro-Romanians would form a community in Krk that would influence the local Croatian dialect and leave several toponyms on the island. The Istro-Romanians of Krk disappeared in 1875 after the death of the last speaker of the local Istro-Romanian dialect, which some Croatian scholars named "Krko-Romanian". Nowadays, this ethnic group only inhabits Istria.

Venetian Rule (1480–1797) 
The island of Krk was a final Adriatic island to become part of the Venetian Empire. Due to its location, proximity to the Uskoks of Senj, it served as a lookout point, as well as first line of defence against the Uskoks. From that time on, the ruler was a Venetian noble, but the Small and the Large Councils both held a certain autonomy. The doge controlled the clergy but public documents were written in a Glagolitic script, which was widespread here more than anywhere else. At the beginning of 16th century the inhabitants of inland Croatia began to settle in on Krk, as a result of their flight from the Ottoman Turk invasions. Nonetheless, Krk still saw a decline, just like all the other Venetian lands. In year 1527 the town was recorded to have 10,461 inhabitants, while in 1527 it had 8,000.

Austrian Rule 

Austrian rule over the island came after the fall of Venice in 1797 and was briefly (1806–1813) interrupted by the existence of Napoleon's Illyrian Provinces. In 1822 the Austrians separated the island from Dalmatia and linked it to Istria, therefore bringing the islands of Krk, Cres and Lošinj under direct rule from Vienna. This switch contributed to the appearance of Croatian National Revival, so along with nearby coastal town Kastav, the town of Krk played a major role in spreading of Croatian education and culture in the area.

20th century 
The Italian Occupation (1918–1920) was brief, and Krk was handed over to Croatia, then in Yugoslavia, by the Treaty of Rapallo, Italy took Krk again in the Second World War (1941–1943), and German occupation followed from 1943 to 1945. The post-war development of Krk was led by tourism. The building of an airport and then a bridge over to the mainland ensures the future of the development of tourism on this island. In Omišalj there has also been industrial development.

The bridge is at the north end of Krk island and uses the small island of Otoćić Sveti Marko (St. Mark's Islet) as a mid-support.

Economics and infrastructure 

Krk is located rather near the mainland and has been connected to it via a  two-arch concrete bridge since 1980, one of the longest concrete bridges in the world. Due to the proximity to the city of Rijeka, Omišalj also hosts the Rijeka International Airport as well as an oil terminal representing a part of the Port of Rijeka and a petrochemical plant.

Since January 2021,there is an active Krk LNG terminal storage and regasification ship moored in Omisalj, north of Krk, able to receive large LNG carrier ships and then to pump the gas into trans-European pipelines.

Krk is a popular tourist destination, due to its proximity to Slovenia, southern Germany, Austria, and northern Italy. Since the collapse of the Eastern Bloc, many tourists have appeared from Slovakia, Hungary, Romania, and other former Eastern Bloc countries.

Fiber access network 
In 2009 the municipality started the project of building a fiber-optic network on the whole area of the city (the town of Krk and 14 neighboring villages) as part of the town infrastructure. Thereby the focus is on building the passive part of the network, which is the most expensive one and the prerequisite for service providers being able to provide ultra-fast Internet connections and new e-Services. The project is covering 6,243 inhabitants and 6,000 households. The first issue was the elaboration of a cost-benefit analysis in 2009/2010 followed by a preliminary network planning. At the beginning of 2013 the building authority issued the relevant approval. The next step is the elaboration of the main project which is the condition for getting the building permission and by which the project can apply for EU structural funds.

Geography 

Krk is like many Croatian islands, it is rocky and hilly. The rock is mostly karst. The southeast portion of the island is mostly bare as a result of the bora winds.

Some prominent features include:
 Obzova, the highest point at 568 msl
 Vela Luka a harbor on the southeastern end of the island

Culture and religion 
Krk has historically been a center of Croatian culture. Various literature in the Glagolitic alphabet was created and in part preserved on Krk (notably the Baška tablet, one of the oldest preserved texts in Croatian). A monastery lies on the small island of Košljun in a bay off the coast of Krk.

Krk belonged to the Republic of Venice during much of the Middle Ages until its dissolution, when its destinies followed those of Dalmatia. It became part of the Kingdom of Serbs, Croats and Slovenes (later called Yugoslavia) after World War I, in 1920. After that date, the village of Veglia/Krk remained the only predominantly Italian-speaking municipality in Yugoslavia. After World War II, most of the Italians left.

The island of Krk is a participant in the 2020 European Capital of Culture project. Through the program "27 neighborhoods", the city of Krk, Malinska and Vrbnik will be involved in different events during the entire year. Along with them, the Municipality of Baška participated in the program "Lungomare Art", based on which a permanent art installation "Drops" was set up, which puts emphasis on traditional drywall architecture.

Monuments and sights 
 The Baška tablet in Jurandvor that was made in 1100.
 Church of St. Lucy in Jurandvor, where the famous Baška tablet was found.
 Art installation "Drops" on the hill above Baška
 Krk Cathedral that is dedicated to the Assumption of the Blessed Virgin Mary.
 Krk Bridge which connects the island of Krk with the mainland since July 19, 1980.

Language 
Krk is well known for its historical language diversity. The Middle Chakavian dialect of Croatian is the primary dialect used on the island. Five languages used to be spoken on the island: Venetian, Italian, Croatian, Dalmatian and Istro-Romanian, although the latter two have gone extinct in the island (and everywhere else in the case of Dalmatian). It must be noted the Croatian dialect of Krk has notable Istro-Romanian influence.

Municipalities

The municipalities and larger settlements on Krk include:
 Omišalj: 2,987 people
 Malinska-Dubašnica – Malinska, the capital of municipality (Italian: Malinsca; German: Durischal): 3,142 people
 Punat (Italian: Ponte; German: Sankt Maria): 1,953 people
 Dobrinj (Italian: Dobrigno; German: Dobrauen): 2,023 people
 Baška (Italian: Besca; German: Weschke): 1,668 people
 Vrbnik (Italian: Verbenico; German: Vörbnick): 1,270 people
 Gabonjin
 Krašica
 Anton
 Pinezići
 Glavotok
 Valbiska
 Njivice
 Poljice
 Nenadići
 Sveti Vid Miholjice

Roman Catholic bishopric 

Church of St. Dunat

Other 
The fictional island Everon from the video game Operation Flashpoint: Cold War Crisis is based on Krk.

The 45th parallel north passes through the island of Krk, making it positioned halfway between the Equator and the North Pole. The crossing of the 45th parallel is marked with a signpost.

Genetics

The frequency of Haplogroup I, rare elsewhere in Croatia and most of Europe, is high among the population.

See also 
 List of islands in the Adriatic
 Cres

References

Sources

Further reading 
Anton Bozanić: Mahnić i njegova Staroslavenska akademija. Krk u. Rijeka 2002.

External links 

 Krk official site (tourist board)
 Pictures Krk
 Virtual Tour of Krk
 Krk scuba diving centre
 Krk hiking trails & guidebook

 
Islands of Croatia
Islands of the Adriatic Sea
Landforms of Primorje-Gorski Kotar County